The Indestructibles is an action sports inspired TV show which first appeared on Dave on 8 November 2015. In each episode The Indestructibles team are dropped in a location, where they have to take inspiration from their surroundings and dream up dangerous stunts. With only three days, two props and limited cash to build and test their creations, they must also convince an athlete from the world of action sports to take on their challenge.  The show features action-sports athletes turned media personalities Tim Warwood, Adam Gendle, Joe Rackley and Oliver Peart, and is sponsored by fashion-watch brand Casio G-Shock.

Premise 
The Indestructible takes audiences on an epic journey as they set out to create brand new massive moments inspired by the heroes of Action Sports. Given a key location, £1000 and just three days the countdown is on as the hosts Tim & Gendle set the challenge of dreaming up a spectacular moment and finding a star athlete brave enough to come along for the ride.

Episodes 
The first episode aired on 8 November 2015.

Episode 1 "Bouncing Bombs" Featuring Gary Connery & Sam Hardy

Synopsis: Given a massive zip-line and an inflatable Zorb Tim & Gendle dream up the hair brained idea of trying to bounce a man across a lake and into a target Dambusters style. With just 3 days to pull it off, they’ll need to work out how to safely attach the Zorb and realise it into the water at speed without killing the stunt man inside. Easy, errr not exactly...

Episode 2 "Rickshaw Wreckers" Featuring Chris Akrigg & Tom Dowie
 
Synopsis: So how about we take one of the best trials mountain bikers on the planet, take him to a massive bike park...and then see if he can survive the run riding a rusty rickshaw. 
That’s the crazy  challenge Tim & Gendle set pro rider Chris Akrigg
Will Chris be able to handle the demands of the track? Will Tim & Gendle be brave enough to ride in the back?  There’s only one way to find out…

Episode 3 "Parkour Apocalypse" Featuring Chase Armitage & Martin Wan

Episode 4 "No Snow, No Problem" Featuring Sven Thorgren , Murray Buchan & Dan Wakeham

Episode 5 "Human Hole In One" Featuring Bob Manchester, Luke Padgett, Joe Baddeley, Craig Teague

Episode 6 "Human Marble Run" Featuring 	Tom Down, Dan Whitby, Tom Dowie

Episode 7 "Abandoned BMX" Featuring Jason Phelan

Episode 8 "'Gimme Some Skim" Featuring Ryan Peacock, Jack Battleday & Billy Morgan

Episode 9 "Drift off to Sleep" Featuring  Buttsy Butler & Luke Woodham

Episode 10 "DIY Daredevils" Featuring Lowri Davies, Fathead & Manhead

Episode 11 "Will It Surf" Featuring Andrew Cotton & Lyndon Wake

Episode 12 "Best of"

References

External links 

2015 British television series debuts
2015 British television series endings
2010s British sports television series
Dave (TV channel) original programming
English-language television shows